Diondiori is a small town and commune of the Cercle of Ténenkou in the Mopti Region of Mali. The commune includes 27 villages and in 2009 had a population of 20,160.

The market that is held in the town on Tuesdays serves many settlements in the surrounding region.

References

Communes of Mopti Region